Malagón is a municipality in Ciudad Real, Castile-La Mancha, Spain. , it has a population of 8,731.

References

Municipalities in the Province of Ciudad Real